Immersive commerce or iCommerce is an extension of E-commerce that focuses on improving customer experience by using augmented reality, virtual reality and immersive technology to create virtual smart stores from existing brick and mortar locations.

Rather than an iteration of traditional eCommerce, iCommerce is a form of online shopping that blends physical elements of traditional stores (i.e. rows, shelves, racks, counters, etc.) with digital elements of traditional eCommerce web sites (i.e. mobile commerce, electronic funds transfer, supply chain management, digital marketing, online transaction processing, electronic data interchange, inventory management systems, automated data collection systems and CRM). Immersive commerce platforms give consumers the ability to browse and shop aisles of a virtual store using any online device.

Purpose 

Customers can view three-dimensional images of all products within a retailer's SKU inventory. For retailers, iCommerce seeks to provide omni-channel touchpoint data from the customer, including from social media, allowing retailers to continually optimize their offers in real time. By applying technology, retailers create appealing and visually-stimulating interior and exterior of the stores that motivate consumers to enjoy the shopping process and in-store time spending. It also provides retailers with an increased ability to market their brands and provides co-branding opportunities with suppliers.

References

E-commerce
User interface techniques
Augmented reality